Karras or Karas is a Greek surname. The female form of the surname is Karra or Kara. It may refer, among others, to one of the following people:

Alex Karras (1935–2012), Greek-American football player, professional wrestler, and actor
George Karras (c.1929–2017), American football coach
Ioannis Karras, Greek football personality
Johnny Karras (1928–2008), American football player
Kostas Karras (1936–2012), Greek actor and politician
Lou Karras (1927–2018), American football player
Nolan Karras (born 1944), American politician
 Ruth Karras (born 1957), medieval historian
Ted Karras (born 1964), American football player
Ted Karras III (born 1993), American football player
Theodore Karras (born 1934), American football player
Vasilis Karras (born 1953), Greek singer

Fictional
Father Karras, fictional Greek-American character from the novel The Exorcist
Father Karras, the fictional antagonist of the game Thief 2: The Metal Age

Greek-language surnames
Surnames